Ruben Nathaniel Patterson (born July 31, 1975) is an American former professional basketball player. During his career, he played as a small forward and shooting guard. During his college career at the University of Cincinnati, Patterson earned third-team All-American honors and helped lead the Bearcats to Conference USA titles in both of his seasons there. Drafted by the Los Angeles Lakers in 1998, Patterson began his career with the Greek team AEK Athens BC before joining the Lakers in his rookie season. Later, he played for the NBA teams Seattle SuperSonics, Portland Trail Blazers, Denver Nuggets, Milwaukee Bucks, and Los Angeles Clippers before ending his career with the Lebanese team Champville SC.

Early life
Patterson had a troubled family life, both parents and one of his sisters battled drug addiction, and his father spent time in prison. As a youth, he lived mostly with his mother, Charlene Patterson, who died of a heart attack when he was at the University of Cincinnati.

After hearing of her death while on a road trip at UAB, he rejected an offer to fly home and spend time with his family, instead staying with his team for the game and scoring 32 points. "My mother would have wanted me to play," Patterson later explained.

Patterson started off his college basketball career in the small town of Independence, Kansas at the Independence Community College. He later transferred to the University of Cincinnati.

Professional career
Patterson was a second-round selection of the 1998 NBA Draft (31st pick overall), chosen by the Los Angeles Lakers. Due to the lock-out season of 1998, he started the season in the Greek league playing with AEK Athens BC where he averaged 12.6 points and 3.6 rebounds in 19 games. He later played for the Lakers, the Seattle SuperSonics, the Portland Trail Blazers, the Denver Nuggets, the Milwaukee Bucks, and the Los Angeles Clippers, averaging a career 10.7 points and 4.2 rebounds per game. He nicknamed himself the "Kobe Stopper" after claiming he could play strong defense against NBA superstar Kobe Bryant.

Patterson left the Lakers for Seattle on August 10, 1999, as a free agent. He quickly became known as a solid defensive player and a good shooter, finishing fourth in the league in field goal percentage. He finished his second season in Seattle after starting 74 of 81 games, and third on the team in scoring with 13.6 points per game. After that season, he signed with the Portland Trail Blazers.

In his second year in Portland, trouble began to brew for Patterson. He was punched in the face by teammate Zach Randolph during a practice. Randolph intervened in an argument between Patterson and rookie teammate Qyntel Woods. The move cost Randolph $100,000.
Often outspoken and erratic, Patterson was temporarily suspended from the Trail Blazers in the 2005–06 season for speaking harshly to coach Nate McMillan and refusing to return to a game, upset about his lack of playing time. Patterson later explained his outburst, saying he was frustrated and it was "like the devil hit me and told me to get it out". He also demanded that he get at least 25 minutes per game or be traded.

In February 2006, Patterson was traded to the Denver Nuggets. In the following off-season, he was traded to the Milwaukee Bucks for Joe Smith. In Milwaukee, Patterson posted the best numbers of his career with 14.7 points, 2.9 assists and 31.0 minutes per game. He also tied a career-high in rebounds per game with 5.4 and posted a career-best 55% field goal average.

On August 29, 2007, Patterson signed a contract with the Los Angeles Clippers. Patterson was waived by the Clippers on December 13, 2007. He later joined the Lebanese club Champville.

Career statistics

NBA

Regular season

|-
| align="left" | 1998–99
| align="left" | Los Angeles
| 24 || 2 || 6.0 || .412 || .167 || .710 || 1.3 || 0.1 || 0.2 || 0.1 || 2.7
|-
| align="left" | 1999–00
| align="left" | Seattle
| 81 || 74 || 25.9 || .536 || .444 || .692 || 5.4 || 1.6 || 1.2 || 0.5 || 11.6
|-
| align="left" | 2000–01
| align="left" | Seattle
| 76 || 22 || 27.1 || .494 || .056 || .681 || 5.0 || 2.1 || 1.4 || 0.6 || 13.0
|-
| align="left" | 2001–02
| align="left" | Portland
| 75 || 13 || 23.5 || .515 || .250 || .701 || 4.0 || 1.4 || 1.1 || 0.5 || 11.2
|-
| align="left" | 2002–03
| align="left" | Portland
| 78 || 17 || 21.2 || .492 || .150 || .627 || 3.4 || 1.3 || 0.9 || 0.4 || 8.3
|-
| align="left" | 2003–04
| align="left" | Portland
| 73 || 1 || 22.6 || .506 || .167 || .553 || 3.7 || 1.9 || 1.2 || 0.3 || 6.9
|-
| align="left" | 2004–05
| align="left" | Portland
| 70 || 36 || 28.0 || .531 || .080 || .599 || 3.9 || 2.0 || 1.5 || 0.3 || 11.6
|-
| align="left" | 2005–06
| align="left" | Portland
| 45 || 2 || 23.5 || .496 || .000 || .611 || 3.4 || 1.3 || 0.9 || 0.3 || 11.4
|-
| align="left" | 2005–06
| align="left" | Denver
| 26 || 20 || 28.3 || .543 || .167 || .580 || 3.5 || 2.6 || 1.3 || 0.3 || 13.2
|-
| align="left" | 2006–07
| align="left" | Milwaukee
| 81 || 53 || 31.0 || .548 || .158 || .641 || 5.4 || 2.9 || 1.4 || 0.3 || 14.7
|-
| align="left" | 2007–08
| align="left" | Los Angeles
| 20 || 5 || 16.4 || .453 || .000 || .558 || 3.2 || 0.9 || 1.1 || 0.4 || 5.1
|- class="sortbottom"
| style="text-align:center;" colspan="2"| Career
| 649 || 245 || 24.6 || .517 || .179 || .641 || 4.2 || 1.8 || 1.2 || 0.4 || 10.7
|}

Playoffs

|-
| align="left" | 1998–99
| align="left" | Los Angeles
| 3 || 0 || 1.7 || .000 || .000 || .000 || 0.0 || 0.0 || 0.0 || 0.0 || 0.0
|-
| align="left" | 1999–00
| align="left" | Seattle
| 5 || 0 || 16.8 || .538 || .000 || .867 || 3.0 || 0.4 || 0.6 || 0.4 || 8.2
|-
| align="left" | 2001–02
| align="left" | Portland
| 3 || 0 || 21.7 || .333 || .000 || .750 || 2.3 || 0.3 || 1.0 || 0.3 || 5.3
|-
| align="left" | 2002–03
| align="left" | Portland
| 7 || 0 || 22.1 || .481 || .000 || .690 || 3.7 || 1.6 || 0.6 || 0.1 || 10.0
|-
| align="left" | 2005–06
| align="left" | Denver
| 4 || 1 || 14.5 || .529 || .000 || .400 || 1.5 || 0.8 || 0.3 || 0.0 || 5.0
|- class="sortbottom"
| style="text-align:center;" colspan="2"| Career
| 22 || 1 || 16.7 || .477 || .000 || .719 || 2.5 || 0.8 || 0.5 || 0.2 || 6.7
|}

College

|-
| align="left" | 1996–97
| align="left" | Cincinnati
| 31 || 26 || 23.3 || .548 || .282 || .604 || 5.6 || 1.4 || 1.1 || 0.3 || 13.7
|-
| align="left" | 1997–98
| align="left" | Cincinnati
| 19 || 14 || 27.9 || .472 || .269 || .602 || 6.3 || 2.2 || 1.2 || 0.6 || 16.5
|- class="sortbottom"
| style="text-align:center;" colspan="2"| Career
| 50 || 40 || 25.1 || .515 || .274 || .603 || 5.9 || 1.7 || 1.1 || 0.4 || 14.8
|}

Legal issues
Patterson was involved in a number of off-the-court issues during his basketball career. He would have to register himself as a sex offender to establish legal residency in many U.S. states, due to pleading guilty in 2001 to attempted rape of his child's nanny in September 2000. It was reported that he forced the nanny to perform a sex act on him. In February 2001, Patterson was convicted of misdemeanor assault for attacking a man who scratched his car outside a Cleveland, Ohio night club. Patterson was arrested in 2002 for felony domestic abuse charges on his wife. His wife later dropped the charges and they divorced.

He was accused of failing to register as a sex offender on May 15, 2007, after moving into a new house in Cincinnati and a bench warrant was issued. His agent, former NFL player Tim McGee, said Patterson's failure to register was "an oversight" after Patterson was ordered to pay a $1,000 fine on June 8.

In March 2010, Patterson was arrested in Hamilton County, Ohio on DUI charges after it was found that his blood alcohol level was .117. He was sentenced to a $500 fine and a three-day driving program, and was ordered not to consume alcohol for 18 months.

In 2019, Patterson plead guilty to charges of unpaid child support. While at one point he owed more than $100,000, he told The Cincinnati Enquirer that he is currently paying down this debt.

References

External links
Ruben Patterson biography at NBA.com

Ruben Patterson stats with AEK
College stats

1975 births
Living people
21st-century American criminals
AEK B.C. players
African-American basketball players
American expatriate basketball people in Greece
American expatriate basketball people in Lebanon
American male criminals
American men's basketball players
American people convicted of assault
American sportspeople convicted of crimes
Basketball players from Cleveland
Big3 players
Cincinnati Bearcats men's basketball players
Denver Nuggets players
Greek Basket League players
Independence Pirates men's basketball players
Los Angeles Clippers players
Los Angeles Lakers draft picks
Los Angeles Lakers players
Milwaukee Bucks players
People who entered an Alford plea
Portland Trail Blazers players
Seattle SuperSonics players
Small forwards
21st-century African-American sportspeople
20th-century African-American sportspeople
American men's 3x3 basketball players